The 1970 Copa Libertadores Finals were the two-legged final that decided the winner of the 1970 Copa Libertadores, the 11th edition of the Copa Libertadores de América, South America's premier international club football tournament organized by CONMEBOL.

The finals were contested in two-legged home-and-away format between Argentine team Estudiantes de La Plata
and Uruguayan team Peñarol. The first leg was hosted by Estudiantes in Estudiantes Stadium in La Plata on May 21, 1970, while the second leg was held in Estadio Centenario of Montevideo on May 27, 1970.

Estudiantes won the series 1-0 on aggregate, winning their 3rd title consecutive of Copa Libertadores.

Qualified teams

Stadiums

Match details

First leg

Second leg

References

1970
1
l
l
1970 in Uruguayan football
1970 in Argentine football
Football in Buenos Aires Province
Football in Montevideo